Daughter of Eve was released on 30 November 2000 and is a studio album from Swedish pop and country singer Jill Johnson. It peaked at number 59 on the Swedish Albums Chart.

Track listing
Mother's Jewel - 3:38
Secrets in My Life - 3:29
My Love for You - 4:40
Live for Today - 4:16
It's Only You - 3:34
Everybody's Confidante - 4:07
When I Look at You - 4:06
No One Else But You - 3:17
Only in Your Dreams - 4:19
Lonely, Lonely - 4:11
It's Too Late - 5:38

Charts

References

External links

2000 albums
Jill Johnson albums